"Wild Love" is a song recorded by English singer-songwriter James Bay, from his second studio album, Electric Light (2018). The song was released by Republic Records on 8 February 2018 as the lead single off the album. It reached number 39 on the UK Singles Chart on 16 February 2018. In 2020, the song was used by Virgin Media as hold music.

Music video
A lyric video to accompany the release of "Wild Love" was first released onto YouTube on 8 February 2018, through James Bay's official YouTube account.

The official music video was directed by Marc Klasfeld and released on 19 February 2018. Natalia Dyer appears in the video.

Track listing

Charts

Weekly charts

Year-end charts

Certifications

Release history

References

2018 singles
2018 songs
Republic Records singles
James Bay (singer) songs
Songs written by James Bay (singer)
Song recordings produced by Paul Epworth